The 2006 ICC Awards were held on 3 November 2006 in Mumbai, India. The annual awards had been instigated in London in 2004 and in 2005 they were announced in Sydney. They were sponsored by Hyundai and conducted during the 2006 ICC Champions Trophy. For the first time, honours for both Captain of the Year and Women's Cricketer of the Year were awarded.

Selection Committee
Nominees were voted on by a 56-member academy of current and ex-players and officials from among players chosen by the ICC Selection Committee, chaired by ICC Cricket Hall of Famer Sunil Gavaskar.

Selection Committee members:

 Sunil Gavaskar (chairman)
 Allan Donald
 Ian Healy
 Arjuna Ranatunga
 Waqar Younis

Winners and nominees
The winners and nominees of various individual awards were:

Cricketer of the Year

Winner: Ricky Ponting (Aus)
Nominees: Shane Warne (Aus), Muttiah Muralitharan (SL), Michael Hussey (Aus), Andrew Flintoff (Eng), Mohammad Yousuf (Pak), Rahul Dravid (Ind), Mahela Jayawardene (SL), Younis Khan (Pak), Monty Panesar (Eng), Brett Lee (Aus), Makhaya Ntini (SA), Adam Gilchrist (Aus)

Test Player of the Year

Winner: Ricky Ponting (Aus)
Nominees: Michael Hussey (Aus), Mohammad Yousuf (Pak), Andrew Flintoff (Eng), Shane Warne (Aus), Muttiah Muralitharan (SL), Rahul Dravid (Ind), Mahela Jayawardene (SL), Younis Khan (Pak), Matthew Hayden (Aus), Makhaya Ntini (SA), Kumar Sangakkara (SL), Kevin Pietersen (Eng)

ODI Player of the Year

Winner: Michael Hussey (Aus)
Nominees: Ricky Ponting (Aus), Andrew Flintoff (Eng), Mahela Jayawardene (SL), Kumar Sangakkara (SL), Rahul Dravid (Ind), Muttiah Muralitharan (SL), Kevin Pietersen (Eng), Mohammad Yousuf (Pak), Brett Lee (Aus), Herschelle Gibbs (SA), Shahid Afridi (Pak), Inzamam-ul-Haq (Pak), Adam Gilchrist (Aus), Yuvraj Singh (Ind), Shane Bond (NZ), Irfan Pathan (Ind)

Emerging Player of the Year

Winner: Ian Bell (Eng)
Nominees: Monty Panesar (Eng), Alastair Cook (Eng), Denesh Ramdin (WI), Malinga Bandara (SL), Mohammad Asif (Pak), Upul Tharanga (SL), Shahriar Nafees (Ban)

Umpire of the Year

Winner: Simon Taufel (Aus)
Nominees: Aleem Dar (Pak), Rudi Koertzen (SA)

Captain of the Year
Winner: Mahela Jayawardene (SL)
Nominees: Rahul Dravid (Ind), Ricky Ponting (Aus), Michael Vaughan (Eng)

Women's Cricketer of the Year

Winner: Karen Rolton (Aus)
Nominees: Cathryn Fitzpatrick (Aus), Anjum Chopra (Ind), Neetu David (Ind), Claire Taylor (Eng), Katherine Brunt (Eng), Emily Drumm (NZ)

Spirit of Cricket
Winner: England

ICC World XI Teams

ICC Test Team of the Year

Rahul Dravid was selected as the captain of the Test Team of the Year. In addition to a wicket-keeper, 9 other players and a 12th man were announced as follows:

 Matthew Hayden
 Michael Hussey
 Ricky Ponting
 Rahul Dravid
 Mohammad Yousuf
 Kumar Sangakkara (wicket-keeper)
 Andrew Flintoff
 Shane Warne
 Makhaya Ntini
 Muttiah Muralitharan
 Glenn McGrath
 Brett Lee (12th man)

ICC ODI Team of the Year

Mahela Jayawardene was selected as the captain of the ODI Team of the Year. In addition to a wicket-keeper, 9 other players and a 12th man were announced as follows:

 Adam Gilchrist (wicket-keeper)
 MS Dhoni
 Ricky Ponting
 Mahela Jayawardene
 Yuvraj Singh
 Michael Hussey
 Andrew Flintoff
 Irfan Pathan
 Brett Lee
 Shane Bond
 Muttiah Muralitharan
 Andrew Symonds (12th man)

Short lists

Cricketer of the Year
 Michael Hussey
 Muttiah Muralitharan
 Ricky Ponting
 Mohammad Yousuf

Test Player of the Year
 Muttiah Muralitharan
 Ricky Ponting
 Shane Warne
 Mohammad Yousuf

ODI Player of the Year
 Michael Hussey
 Mahela Jayawardene
 Ricky Ponting
 Yuvraj Singh

Emerging Player of the Year
 Alastair Cook
 Mohammad Asif
 Ian Bell
 Monty Panesar

Women's Cricketer of the Year
 Karen Rolton
 Anjum Chopra
 Katherine Brunt

Spirit of Cricket
 India
 England

See also

 International Cricket Council
 ICC Awards
 Sir Garfield Sobers Trophy (Cricketer of the Year)
 ICC Test Player of the Year
 ICC ODI Player of the Year
 David Shepherd Trophy (Umpire of the Year)
 ICC Women's Cricketer of the Year
 ICC Test Team of the Year
 ICC ODI Team of the Year

References

External links
 Official ICC Awards Web Site

International Cricket Council awards and rankings
Crick
2006 in cricket